Paul Ji (born 14 January 2004) is a Chinese American pianist.

Early life 
Paul Ji was born in Chicago from a family of Chinese descendants. His mother, Xiaowei Rose Luo, is a professor at INSEAD. Paul Ji started his musical journey when he was just between 4 and 5 years old. His elder sister Esther had a big impact on his interest in piano, as she also played the instrument. 

At the age of 12, he was under the instruction of Elizabeth Cooper at the prestigious Schola Cantorum in Paris, then at École Normale de musique de Paris with teacher Jean-Bernard Pommier.

He currently lives in Fontainebleau, France.

Paul Ji is also a Steinway artist.

Competitions and awards

Concerts 
Played Liszt 2 with the ECSO, conducted by Leandro Silvera, in the Barbican Complex.

Prodiges 
In 2019, he won the Prodiges Season 6 competition. In the semi-final, he played the Tchaikovsky's Piano Concerto No. 1, moving to the finals where he played Chopin's Polonaise No. 6 Opus 53. He won the competition and was awarded the trophy from concert pianist Lang Lang, with prize money of 10 thousand euros.

He was awarded the distinction of Bellifontain d’honneur from the mayor of Fontainebleau.

Charities and project

Paul Ji regularly played in the palliative care unit of the Fontainebleau hospital, wishing through music to help people in need. In this momentum, in January 2021, he launched the project called "Music for Good" in French: "Musique pour le bien" which aims to share music with people in need, and to encourage other musicians who wish bring change to the world. In the context of the health crisis, he is notably organizing a virtual concert for the New Year. This initiative receives the Khemka award for social impact from Eton College.

Albums 
Paul has recently released his album Piano by Warner Classics, after his win in Prodiges. He has also accompanied Sarah Brightman in her album France.

References

External links 
 

2004 births
Living people
21st-century Chinese musicians
21st-century French male classical pianists
21st-century male musicians
Chinese classical pianists
American classical pianists
Child classical musicians
Male classical pianists
People's Republic of China musicians